Lesbian, gay, bisexual, and transgender (LGBT) people in Tajikistan face legal challenges not experienced by non-LGBT residents. Both male and female same-sex sexual activity are legal in Tajikistan, but same-sex couples and households headed by same-sex couples are not eligible for the same legal protections available to heterosexual married couples.

LGBT people tend to face frequent discrimination, harassment and violence from the authorities and the Muslim-majority public.

Legality of same-sex sexual activity and LGBT Activism
Both male and female same-sex sexual activity have been legal in Tajikistan since 1998. The age of consent is 16, regardless of gender or sexual orientation.

LGBT rights activism is not supported in the country, whether by the government or the majority of people in society. Tajikistan for Equality, founded in 2019 by Odinasho Sharopov, is the only LGBTQ+ support organization recognized by the Tajikistan government.

Recognition of same-sex relationships
Tajikistan does not recognize same-sex unions.

Gender identity and expression
Transgender people "face a lot of stigma and discrimination" in Tajikistan.

Under Tajik law, transgender people may change their legal gender on their passport if they provide a medical statement that they have undergone sex reassignment surgery. In practice, however, the lack of awareness, coupled with corruption and bureaucracy, means the process can be far more difficult. As of 2014, there have only been two gender change operations in Tajikistan, the first in 2001 and the second in January 2014.

Living conditions
Even though the law does not prohibit same-sex sexual activity, the living conditions in the country is not favourable for LGBT people. This is mostly due to local religion and beliefs, as well as outside influence. Harassment from police and the public is common. In 2017, the authorities drew up an "official list" of LGBT citizens following two state operations named "Morality" and "Purge".

Public opinion 
Islamic religious leaders have significant influence on the position of Tajik society on LGBT topics. The Supreme Mufti of Tajikistan Saidmukarram Abdulkodirzoda has publicly condemned same-sex relations, calling them a "disaster". In addition, he condemned countries that have legalized same-sex marriages, and spoke out against human rights activists and laws to protect LGBT people from discrimination.

A number of Tajik psychologists and doctors consider homosexuality to be a form of addiction comparable to drug addiction and alcoholism, and provide "cure methods". These are considered pseudoscience by the World Health Organization, however. There are several reported cases of disrespectful treatment to LGBT-patients by medical staff.

Summary table

See also

Human rights in Tajikistan
LGBT rights in Asia

References

Human rights in Tajikistan
Tajikistan
LGBT in Tajikistan